Gao Yuanyuan (born 5 October 1979) is a Chinese actress and model.
She ranked 64th on Forbes China Celebrity 100 list in 2013, 40th in 2014, 76th in 2015, and 86th in 2017.

Career
Gao Yuanyuan was born in Beijing and graduated from China Institute of Industrial Relations. Gao entered the entertainment industry in 1996. Gao, unlike other mainland Chinese actresses, did not graduate from any drama academic institutions. Rather, she started acting in a television commercial for Meadow Gold ice-cream after being spotted on the street at Beijing's Wangfujing shopping district.

Gao made her debut in the 1997 film Spicy Love Soup. Thereafter, she starred in Beijing Bicycle (2001), which won the Silver Bear at the Berlin International Film Festival and romance film Spring Subway (2002). She rose to fame in 2003 for her role as Zhou Zhiruo in the television adaptation of Louis Cha's The Heaven Sword and Dragon Saber.

Gao made inroads into the international market with the film Shanghai Dreams (2005), directed by Wang Xiaoshuai, which won the Prix de Jury prize at the Cannes Film Festival. She was then picked by Jackie Chan to star in the action comedy movie Rob-B-Hood (2006). Chan has characterized Gao as having the "freshest look and chaste spirit no Hong Kong actress could approach".

Gao next starred in the romance film Love in the City (2007) opposite Shawn Yue, where she plays a deaf-mute kindergarten teacher. Her performance won her the Newcomer Award at the 11th Golden Phoenix Awards.

Gao was then cast in City of Life and Death (2009), directed by Lu Chuan and based on the events of the Nanjing Massacre. Departing from her "girl-next-door" image, Gao played a middle-aged teacher who helped Nanjing people survive the horrors of the Japanese atrocities in 1937. Gao called the role a "turning point" in her career, stating that she had never started taking acting seriously until she worked on the film. City of Life and Death won the
top prize at the 2009 San Sebastian Film Festival.

In 2010, Gao starred alongside Korean actor Jung Woo-sung in the romantic film A Season of Good Rain directed by Hur Jin-ho, as well as the omnibus romance drama film Driverless. The following year, she starred in Johnnie To's romantic comedy Don't Go Breaking My Heart alongside Daniel Wu.

In 2012, Gao starred in Chen Kaige's Caught in the Web where she plays a young woman who commits suicide after she becomes embroiled in a social media controversy. The film was especially popular among young viewers, drawing more than six million viewers and praise from critics.

Gao returned to television in 2013 with the television series Let's Get Married, playing a "leftover" unmarried woman who gets entangled with a man who has a phobia of marriage. The series was a commercial hit, and was the highest rated drama of 2013. For her performance, Gao won the Best Actress Award at the 18th Beijing Chunyan Awards. Gao reprised her role in the film adaptation of the drama.

Gao then starred alongside Nicholas Tse in the romantic film But Always (2014). She won the Best Foreign Actress Award at the 52nd Grand Bell Awards.

In 2017, Gao ranked 86th on Forbes China Celebrity 100 list.

After a two-year hiatus, Gao confirmed her return to the screen with Juno Mak's gangster epic Sons of the Neon Night.

Other activities
Gao was a torch-bearer in the Nanjing leg of the torch relay for the 2008 Olympics in Beijing.

In 2012, Gao became the first Chinese brand ambassador for French luxury house Longchamp.

Gao was appointed as California's tourism ambassador to China in 2013. She was picked as she "embodies the California brand and spirit and will share her authentic passion for California with the Chinese public, inspiring their California dreams".

In 2020, Gao became the brand ambassador for Michael Kors.

Since 2021, Gao became the brand spokesperson for French high-end jeweller Chaumet.

Personal life
Gao married Taiwanese actor Mark Chao in 2014. The two met on the set of Caught in the Web and welcomed a daughter - Rhea Chao in June 2019 one month after announcing that Gao was pregnant. Yuanyuan has been a vegetarian since 2009.

Filmography

Film

Television series

Theater

Awards and nominations

References

External links

1975 births
Living people
Chinese film actresses
Chinese television actresses
20th-century Chinese actresses
21st-century Chinese actresses
Actresses from Beijing